Marco Fiorito known as Kaos One, Don Kaos, Dottor K, Ahmad or simply Kaos (born June 11, 1971 in Caserta) is an Italian rapper, beatmaker, and writer. He began his career in 1986 in Milan, first as a breakdancer and writer, then as an MC, first in English and then in Italian. Kaos One is acknowledged as one of the forerunners of Italian Rap.

1980s and 1990s

A former writer, Kaos, with DJ Gruff and American MC Top Cat, formed the Fresh Press Crew in 1986, which also includes DJ Skizo and Sean Martin. Dre Love later joined the group, which was renamed Radical Stuff.

In 1989 Radical Stuff released their first single, Let's Get Dizzy. In 1990, after releasing a second single, I Guess You Know, Radical Stuff worked on a live album recorded in collaboration with jazz musicians Lo Greco Bros. The LP The Jazzy Rap Night Live was released in 1992, followed by the single Summer Fever (1993) and On tha Run (1994). 

In 1993 Kaos collaborated with other artists, first with DJ Gruff in the album Rapadopa (with the song "Don Kaos") and then with "Hello, hello I hate the hard Full of Colle der Fomento". 

Radical Stuff's second album, Hardaswallow, was released in 1994. Kaos began working to release his first album in Italian, named Fastidio (discomfort). It was released in 1996 with the collaboration of Neffa (credited as Piscopo), MDee, Loudy NCN and Sean. Kaos collaborated with Neffa again with two tracks on the disc Neffa & i Messaggeri della Dopa: "I Messaggeri Pt.1" and "I fieri B-Boyz."

Neffa collaborates on Fastidio, and produced most of the tracks on the disc (one of them with Kaos).

After his solo debut he continued collaborations with different artists and in 1997, he appeared on Chief & Soci's Gruff Zero Stress.

Also in 1997, the Kaos appeared on the soundtrack for the film Torino Boys with the song "Quando vengo a prenderti", and on the Neffa album 107 elementi on the song "Strategie dell'universo".

The following year he released an album containing remixes of the tracks on Fastidio, titled "Kaos '98 Remix".

In 1999 he released "Cose preziose", which was added to Novecinquanta Fritz Da Cat, with Sean and Chico MD of Sangue Misto group Melma & Merda, with whom he released the album Merda & Melma.

In the same year -/-/-/-/- L'attesa was released, in collaboration with Freaktons, as well as producers Chico MD and Neffa, and Kaos.

2000s

In 2002 he participated in the project Neo Ex, impromptu training consists of Kaos and Gopher which publishes The missing disc, which features collaborations Moddi MC, Phase 2, Turi, Lugi and B. Soulee.
In 2006, one of the leaders of the project "The Original" by Speaker Dee Mo where the soundtrack composer Franco Micalizzi and some of the best artists of Hip hop music Micalizzi Italian joined with the Hip Hop culture. On May 30, 2006 was held at Rolling Stone in Milan's spectacular concert by Red Bull Homegroove, characterized by the sound of Big Bubbling Band conducted by Franco Micalizzi joined on stage by MCs, B-boys and DJ. Everything was taken and was released on newsstands June 20 attached to the magazine Groove. The concert was then replicated December 20, 2006 at the Teatro Palladium in Rome.
In October 2007, he released Karma, Mc penultimate album, produced by himself, DJ Trix, Don Joe, DJ Shablo, Mace and DJ Silver. It features collaborations with artists of the Italian scene as Turi, Club Dogo, Colle Der Fomento and Moddi MC.
In 2011 he collaborated with Deda to produce, under the name BBeat, two tracks the No. 1 "Fifteen minutes," and No. 9 "National Anthem Personal" Hypnosis Collective, disk Musteeno [1].
His last work, the album was released Post Scripta November 11, 2011 with the official shirt that mimics the explanation on the disc. In conjunction Kaos launched the new official website [2] and the Twitter profile [3]. Among the different tracks glories unpublished already made famous in his live, as Dr. K and the 2 half of which was filmed a video [4] (Made by Alberto Salvucci) posted on YouTube in conjunction with the album. At 48 hours of release, the disc reaches the first position in "Hip-Hop" in iTunes and fourth place overall among the best selling records in Italy. [5] In addition to digital, the album sold very well in support physical, doing sold out in many shops in Italy where it was distributed.
On 27 November 2011 he was host of the radio program of Rai Radio 2 Babylon [6] conducted by Charles Shepherd where he explained "track by track" (track to track) the whole album Post Scripta. This presentation radio, accompanied by clips of the songs, is one of the few appearances of an average of national importance Kaos has always been reluctant to media exposure.
Kaos is one of the few b-boy to have reached all the major disciplines of hip hop. [7] [8] In addition to writers, breakers and mc, in fact, he stood behind the plates as a DJ in some of his works. In addition, since '96 intro of "discomfort", and in 1998 in Viva Los Latinos (track album Fly Cat), began composing foundation for hip-hop, then that role he was also in the songs "Flow dopo flow (giocando col destino)" and "Dio lodato (per questa chance)", made in 1998 and 1999 for the rapper Joe Cassano, as well as other pieces of -/-/-/-/- (L'attesa), Merda & Melma and kARMA (under the pseudonym of Ahmad).
In 2011 there took place the Hip Hop Hano Award 2011 created a poll on the site Hano.it to decide the best Hip Hop album of the year, which saw the participation of over 13,000 persone.Il prize for best album of the year was won by Kaos with his album Post Scripta

Discography

Soloist
1996 - Fastidio
1999 - L'attesa
2007 - Karma
2011 - Post Scripta
2015 - Coup de Grace

With Radical Stuff
1989 – Let's Get Dizzy (single)
1990 – I Guess U Know  (single)
1992 - The Jazzy Rap Night - Live (with Lo Greco Bros.) 
1993 – Summer Fever  (single)
1994 - Hardaswallow 
1994 – Ontha Run  (single)
1999 – Let's Get Dizzy (feat. MC Top Cat and Soul Boy)  (single)

With Melma & Merda
1999 - Merda & Melma

With Neo Ex
2002 - ''L'anello mancante (EP)

External sources
«Post scripta» con il rapper Kaos One  Corriere del Mezzogiorno 
Messina: grande successo per il concerto di Kaos One, still.it

1971 births
Living people
Italian rappers
Italian graffiti artists